Palazzo Gonzaga-Acerbi is a historic palace in Castel Goffredo in the Province of Mantua in Italy. 

It forms the whole north front of Piazza Mazzini in the city centre. It was used by Aloisio Gonzaga to host his court from 1511 to 1549 and to host a visit Charles V, Holy Roman Emperor in 1543. It was the birthplace of Giovanni Acerbi, who on 27–29 April 1862 used it to host Garibaldi.

References

Bibliography 
 Costante Berselli, Castelgoffredo nella storia, Mantova, 1978.
 Francesco Bonfiglio, Notizie storiche di Castelgoffredo, 2ª ed., Mantova, 2005, .
 Carlo Gozzi, Raccolta di documenti per la storia patria od Effemeridi storiche patrie, Tomo II, Mantova, 2003, .

Castel Goffredo
Gonzaga residences
Gonzaga-Acerbi
Gonzaga-Acerbi